Troy Joseph Glass (born July 27, 2000) is an American actor, chef, YouTuber, and social media personality.

In 2013, Glass became a semi-finalist on the first season of the American reality cooking competition MasterChef Junior. He cooked on the show at age 12 and finished in fourth place. He later cooked on programs such as The Home and Family Show and Access Hollywood. He also appeared as a contestant on the cooking game show Food Fighters where he was the first minor (at age 14 at the time) ever to compete, winning $20,000 and a full scholarship to The Culinary Institute of America.

Glass has worked with YouTube stars TheFineBros, appearing as a regular in the hit series Kids React (and on Teens React after September 2014) and appearing as a guest in another one of TheFineBros' web series, MyMusic.

Glass has also made appearances in Modern Family, True Blood, and Marvel's Agents of S.H.I.E.L.D. He landed a lead role on an episode of Nickelodeon's Deadtime Stories. He and fellow Deadtime Stories cast members were interviewed on Piper's Quick Picks. He has appeared in numerous commercials, music videos, and voice-over work.  Troy also trains in wrestling and MMA.

Career
Glass considers his father and Oreste Di Gregorio, the head chef at D’Amore's Pizza in Camarillo, California, as his culinary mentors. Glass's mother, Polly, is a waitress and manager at the pizzeria. Troy and his sister Emily appeared on a game show where they won the grand prize round-trip all expenses paid Hawaii Marriott resorts package worth $9,000.  
Glass cooked as a hobby since age 7, and began acting at age 10. He remembers his first kitchen session with his grandmother over the holidays. She was making latkes which he remembers as taking a long time. Glass is currently in college and training as a pro gamer.  He says cooking is his main passion and he would give up an acting career to become a professional chef. Pasta is his favorite food to make.

Filmography

Film

Television

Personal life
Glass currently lives in Thousand Oaks, California with his parents, Scott and Polly, and his sister Emily Glass.

See also
 MasterChef Junior

References

External links
 
 The Fine Bros on YouTube

2000 births
Living people
American chefs
American male child actors
Place of birth missing (living people)
Contestants on American game shows
People from Thousand Oaks, California